László Fekete  (born 1958, in Ősi) is a strongman from Hungary.  He was ten times Hungarian Strongest Man from 1988 to 1997 and participated in the World's Strongest Man  finals of 1988, 1989, 1990 and 1999.
Between 1991-2001 in parallel with original WSM series, Fekete organised the world natural strongest man mini series in Hungary in which he also participated. His son also competes in strongman competition.

National results
 1988-1997 Hungarian Strongest Man (tenfold champion)
 1989-1991 Hungarian Toldi Miklós race winner
 1998-2004 Hungarian Strongest Man race winner

International  results 

 1988 WSM World Race 8th place
 1989 WSM World Race 5th place
 1990 WSM World Race 6th place
 1992 WSM European Championship 1st place
 1997 WSM Grand Prix 3rd place
 1998 WSM Grand Prix 3rd place
 1999 WSM Grand Prix 3rd place
 2000 WSM World Race 8th place
 2000 WSM World event race 5th place 
 2001 WSM Olympics even 6th place
 2001 Unique Olympics champion, 222 kg stone lift - world record
 2002 WSM European Cup Race event 1st place
 2002 WSM European Cup Team 1st place
 2003 WSM World Championship event 2nd place
 2003 Unique world champion 232.5 kg stone lift - world record
 2004 WSM Continent Team 4th place
 2004 WSM Continent EC event 1st place

Honours 
 1991 Hungarian perpetually Toldi Miklós rank
 1991-1992-1993 the best adult sport man in Komárom-Esztergom county
 1993 The best sport man of the town of Dorog
 1994 Sport glory prize
 1994-2004 The best extreme sport man on Komárom-Esztergom county
 2002 March 15 Hungarian Republic merit Knight Cross

References

External links
 Personal website

1958 births
Living people
Hungarian strength athletes